The European Rugby Club Rankings were introduced for the 2008–09 European season. They were based on the points earned by teams in the now defunct Heineken Cup and the European Challenge Cup over the past four years. They were used to aid in the seeding process for the Heineken Cup and the European Challenge Cup. For the Heineken Cup the first four tiers are defined by these rankings. In addition, the Cup holder is automatically added to the top tier.

Starting with the 2009–10 season, the rankings have the potential to determine one entrant in the following season's Heineken Cup. If England or France produces winners of both European cups in a season, a Heineken Cup berth will be awarded to the highest-ranked team not from that nation and not already qualified to the Heineken Cup. (The winners of both cups receive automatic berths in the next season's Heineken Cup, separately from the allocations of their countries; however, England and France are capped at seven Heineken Cup places apiece.) This scenario will also apply if either of Scotland's two professional teams wins either European cup, since those teams are automatically entered in the Heineken Cup at the start of each season.

Current rankings
Per ERC rule, ties between clubs are broken as follows:
 Points earned in the most recent participation in the Heineken Cup, counting back season-by-season until the teams are separated.
 Points earned in the most recent season, counting back season-by-season until the teams are separated.
For example, Harlequins and Cardiff Blues are tied on 15 points.  Both participated in the 2012–13 Heineken Cup where Harlequins earned 5 points (reached the quarter final) whereas Cardiff only earned 2 points (finished 3rd in their pool).  Therefore, Harlequins are ranked higher than Cardiff.  
Another example: Edinburgh and London Wasps are tied on 11 points.  Edinburgh participated in the 2012–13 Heineken Cup (and earned 1 point for finishing 4th in their pool) whereas Wasps played in the 2012–13 European Challenge Cup (and earned 2 points for reaching the quarter finals).  Wasps are ranked below Edinburgh even though they earned more points in the 2012–13 season.

{| class="wikitable"
|+ Key to colours
|-
| bgcolor="#ccffcc" |     
| Denotes teams that will compete for the 2013–14 Heineken Cup
|-
| bgcolor="#bbebff" |     
| Denotes teams that will compete for the 2013–14 Amlin Challenge Cup
|}

Note that a ranking is not necessary for a club to participate in European competition. For example, among the 20 clubs that began the 2011–12 Challenge Cup, only nine had a ranking at the start of that season. In order for a club to be ranked, it must have, in the previous four seasons, either (1) participated in the Heineken Cup or (2) advanced from the pool stage of the Challenge Cup.

Points are earned using the following criteria
Heineken Cup

Pool winners earn the higher of the two figures given for the knock out stages, while pool runners-up receive the lower figure.
 
European Challenge Cup

*Heineken Cup Teams will have picked up 3 points by finishing runner-up in their Heineken Cup Pool

Notes

References

External links
Official site

European Rugby Champions Cup
EPCR Challenge Cup